Sidney J. Parnes (January 5, 1922 – August 19, 2013) was an American academic who was professor at Buffalo State College (located in Buffalo, New York) and the co-founder of the International Center for Studies in Creativity. The center is housed within Buffalo State College, one of the few places in the world that offers a Masters of Science degree in creativity. The department also now offers a distance learning version of the degree to students around the world as well as an undergraduate minor in creative studies.

Parnes was a lifetime trustee of the Creative Education Foundation (CEF). He joined the CEF in 1955 to help develop a comprehensive educational program for the Creative Problem Solving Institute, which is the world's longest-running international creativity conference. In 1966, CEF's founder, Alex Osborn died, leaving Parnes to head the foundation.

Parnes and Alex Osborn developed the Creative Problem Solving Process (CPS), a structured method for generating solutions to problems. This method is taught annually at the International Center for Studies in Creativity, the Creative Problem Solving Institute and the CREA Conference in Europe.

Selected works

References

Creativity researchers
Popular psychology
20th-century American psychologists
1922 births
2013 deaths
Buffalo State College faculty